Solange Santos Bastos (born 29 March 1969) is a Brazilian footballer who played as a defender for the Brazil women's national football team. She was part of the team at the 1991 FIFA Women's World Cup and 1995 FIFA Women's World Cup. At the club level, she played for Euroexport (BA) in Brazil.

References

External links
 
 Profile

1969 births
Living people
Brazilian women's footballers
Brazil women's international footballers
Place of birth missing (living people)
1995 FIFA Women's World Cup players
Women's association football defenders
1991 FIFA Women's World Cup players